Walter Early Craig (May 26, 1909 – June 29, 1986) was a United States district judge of the United States District Court for the District of Arizona.

Education and career

Born in Oakland, California, Craig received a Bachelor of Arts degree from Stanford University in 1931 and a Juris Doctor from Stanford Law School in 1934. He was a lawyer for the Home Owners' Loan Corporation in San Francisco, California from 1934 to 1936, and was in private practice in Phoenix, Arizona from 1936 to 1964, interrupted by service in the United States Navy during World War II.

Federal judicial service

On August 26, 1963, Craig was nominated by President John F. Kennedy to a seat on the United States District Court for the District of Arizona vacated by Judge Arthur Marshall Davis. Craig was confirmed by the United States Senate on September 25, 1963, and received his commission on October 2, 1963. He served as Chief Judge from 1973 to 1979. He assumed senior status on October 1, 1979. He served as a Judge of the Temporary Emergency Court of Appeals from 1982 to 1986. Craig remained in senior status until his death on June 29, 1986, in Phoenix.

References

Sources
 

1909 births
1986 deaths
Judges of the United States District Court for the District of Arizona
United States district court judges appointed by John F. Kennedy
20th-century American judges
Stanford Law School alumni
United States Navy personnel of World War II
Presidents of the American Bar Association